Joyce Collins (born 5 May 1930, Battle Mountain, Nevada - died January 3, 2010) was a jazz pianist, singer and educator.

Collins began playing piano professionally at the age of 15 while still attending Reno High School in Nevada. Later, while studying music and teaching at San Francisco State College, she played in groups and solo at various jazz clubs, eventually going on tour with the Frankie Carle band.

In the late 1950s, Collins settled in Los Angeles, working there and also in Reno and Las Vegas, where she became the first woman to conduct one of the resort's show bands. During this time Collins worked in film and television studios, spending 10 years in the band on the Mary Tyler Moore Show and also on comedian Bob Newhart's shows.

In 1975, she recorded with Bill Henderson. Their Street Of Dreams and Tribute To Johnny Mercer albums were Grammy nominees. Collins continued to work in films, coaching actors Jeff Bridges and Beau Bridges for their roles in The Fabulous Baker Boys (1989).

Beginning in 1975, Collins taught jazz piano at the Dick Grove Music School. Collins wrote and arranged extensively, including a program, performed live and on radio, tracing the involvement of women in jazz as composers and lyricists. She appeared twice on Marian McPartland's Piano Jazz radio show, most recently in 2002.

Although she performed mostly in solo, duo and trio work, Collins occasionally sat in with big bands, such as that led by Bill Berry. She also recorded with Paul Horn and under her own name. Her first album appeared in 1961, her next, Moment To Moment, after a long gap. Centered mainly in Los Angeles, Collins worked farther afield in places such as Mexico City, Paris, New York and Brazil.

Joyce Collins died on January 3, 2010.

Discography
 Girl Here Plays Mean Piano (Jazzland, 1960)
 Moment to Moment (Discovery, 1981)
 Sweet Madness (Audiophile, 1990)
 Embraces the Heart of Brazil (Audiophile, 2005)

With Bill Henderson
 Live at the Times (Discovery, 1975)
 Joey Revisited (Monad, 1976)
 Street of Dreams (Discovery, 1979)
 Something's Gotta Give (Discovery, 1979)
 A Tribute to Johnny Mercer (Discovery, 1981)

With Paul Horn
 Paul Horn and the Concert Ensemble (Ovation, 1969)

References

1930 births
2010 deaths
Women jazz pianists
American jazz pianists
Ovation Records artists
20th-century American pianists
20th-century American women pianists
21st-century American women